James Edward Derrick Sealy (11 September 1912 – 3 January 1982) was a West Indian cricketer who played in 11 Tests from 1930 to 1939.

He made his Test debut at 17 years 122 days, and remains the youngest West Indian Test player.

He played for Barbados from 1928–29 to 1942–43, and for Trinidad from 1943–44 to 1948–49. In 1942, playing for Barbados against Trinidad, he took 8 for 8, dismissing Trinidad for 16.

References

External links
 Derek Sealy at Cricket Archive
 Derek Sealy at Cricinfo

1912 births
1982 deaths
West Indies Test cricketers
Barbadian cricketers
Barbados cricketers
Trinidad and Tobago cricketers
Wicket-keepers